Honpō-ji (本法寺) is the name of several Buddhist temples in Japan:
Honpō-ji (Nakajima) in Nakajima, Fukushima
Honpō-ji (Sumida) in Sumida, Tokyo
Honpō-ji (Bunkyō) in Bunkyō, Tokyo
Honpō-ji (Taitō) in Taitō, Tokyo
Honpō-ji (Toyama) in Toyama, Toyama
Honpō-ji (Kyoto) in Kyoto, Kyoto